Zachariah Alpheus Mahlomola Molotsi (January 19, 1953 – April 11, 2013) was a South African politician.
Molotsi was sworn in as a Member of the Provincial Legislature on 19 February 2011 and was appointed the Whip of the African National Congress (ANC) in the Legislature on March 1, 2011. He was also the Chairman of the Standing Committee on Petitions.

References

1953 births
2013 deaths
African National Congress politicians